The Right Place is the third studio album by American country music artist Bryan White. It was released in 1997 (see 1997 in country music) on Asylum Records. The album produced four chart singles on the Billboard Hot Country Singles & Tracks (now Hot Country Songs) charts. In order of release, these were "Love Is the Right Place", "One Small Miracle", "Bad Day to Let You Go", and "Tree of Hearts", which respectively reached numbers 4, 16, 30, and 45. "Bad Day to Let You Go" also overlapped with White's guest appearance on Shania Twain's 1998 single "From This Moment On".

Track listing

Personnel

 Bryan White – lead vocals (1-10), backing vocals (1, 2, 3, 5, 10), acoustic guitar (3), drums (10), suspended cymbal (10)
 Dennis Burnside – electric piano (1)
 Steve Nathan – Wurlitzer (1), Hammond B3 organ (1, 2, 3, 5, 9), keyboards (2, 7, 8), acoustic piano (4, 6, 10), clavinet (9)
 Larry Byrom – electric guitar (1, 5), gut string guitar (2), acoustic guitar (4, 6-10)
 Mark Casstevens – acoustic guitar (1)
 Billy Joe Walker, Jr. – acoustic guitar (1, 2, 6, 7), gut string guitar (4)
 Paul Franklin – steel guitar (1-10)
 Derek George – acoustic guitar (3, 9), electric guitar (3, 10), echoplex (3), backing vocals (3, 9, 10)
 Sonny Garrish – pedabro (7)
 Brent Mason – six-string bass (1), electric bass solo (1), electric guitar (2, 4-10)
 Michael Rhodes – bass (1, 2, 4, 6, 8, 10)
 Glenn Worf – bass (3, 5, 7, 9)
 Lonnie Wilson – drums (1, 3, 7, 9)
 Paul Leim – drums (2, 4, 6)
 Eddie Bayers – drums (5, 8)
 Tom Roady – percussion (2, 3, 10)
 Aubrey Haynie – fiddle (6, 7), mandolin (7)
 Bekka Bramlett – backing vocals (1)
 Mac McAnally – backing vocals (2)
 Dennis Wilson – backing vocals (2, 4, 5, 7, 8)
 Curtis Young – backing vocals (4, 8)
 Neil Thrasher – backing vocals (5)
 Liana Manis – backing vocals (6)
 Steve Wariner – backing vocals (6)
 Harry Stinson – backing vocals (7)

Production
 Kyle Lehning – producer, mixing 
 Billy Joe Walker, Jr. – producer
 Kevin Bemish – recording engineer 
 Steve Tillisch – recording engineer
 Derek Bason – assistant engineer
 Brian Hardin – assistant engineer
 Amy Hughes Frigo – assistant engineer
 Jason Lehning – overdub engineer, mix assistant 
 Marty McClantoc – overdub engineer
 Koji Egawa – assistant overdub engineer
 Chris Mara – assistant overdub engineer
 Sally Jenkins – mix assistant 
 Glenn Spinner – mix assistant
 Doug Sax – mastering 
 Marla Burns – production coordinator 
 Virginia Team – art direction 
 Chris Ferrara – design 
 Matthew Barnes – photography 
 Ron Davis – photography
 Marty Gamblin – management 
 Stan Schneider – management

Studios
 Overdubs recorded at Woodland Studios; The Compound Studio, Schnee Studios and The Recording Club (Los Angeles, California).
 Mixed at The Compound Studio (Los Angeles, California); Woodland Studios and Ocean Way Nashville (Nashville, Tennessee).
 Mastered at The Mastering Lab (Hollywood, California).

Charts

Weekly charts

Year-end charts

Certifications

References
Citations

Bibliography
Allmusic (see infobox)

1997 albums
Asylum Records albums
Bryan White albums
Albums produced by Kyle Lehning
Albums produced by Billy Joe Walker Jr.